Kolazhy Grama Panchayat, also known as Kolazhy GP, is part of Puzhakkal block, in Thrissur taluk, in Thrissur district.

The group of villages forming the wards given in the table below are governed by Kolazhy Grama Panchayat, Puzhakkal Block Panchayat and Thrissur District Panchayat.

Demographics
 India census, Kolazhy had a population of 8445. Males constitute 49% of the population and females 51%. Kolazhy has an average literacy rate of 85%, higher than the national average of 59.5%: male literacy is 86%, and female literacy is 84%. In Kolazhy, 10% of the population is under 6 years of age. The majority of population are migrated here for residential purposes, as they are employed in Govt. & Private Sector.

History
In ancient days it was then part of Vijayapuram "pravrithi" in Trichur "taluq".

For the purposes of census, Kolazhy Grama Panchayat is divided into three census towns of Kolazhy (CT), Kuttur (CT) and Pottore (CT).

Administration
The administration of the panchayat is done by a council consisting of 17 members elected from the wards of the panchayat. The council will rule for a period of 5 years. Presently, it is ruled by LDF. The front secured majority by winning 12 out of 17 seats in the   elections held in December 2020.

Panchayath Elections

Election 2010

Election 2015

Election 2020

Education
 Chinmaya Mission College, Kolazhy

References

Cities and towns in Thrissur district
Villages in Thrissur district
Kolazhy Grama Panchayat